The 1986 John Player Triangular Tournament was a cricket tournament held in Sri Lanka between 5 and 7 April 1986. Three teams took part in the tournament: Pakistan, New Zealand and hosts Sri Lanka. The tournament ran concurrently with the 1986 Asia Cup and was arranged partly to compensate for the withdrawal of India from the Asia Cup.

The John Player Triangular Tournament was a round-robin tournament where each team played the other once. Each of the three sides won one match each and Pakistan won the tournament on run rate.

Matches

Table

See also
 1986 Asia Cup

References

 Cricinfo tournament page
 Cricket Archive tournament page
 
 

John Player Triangular Tournament
John Player Triangular Tournament
International cricket competitions from 1985–86 to 1988
Cricket, John Player Triangular Tournament, 1986
International cricket competitions in Sri Lanka